Pork blood soup is a soup that uses pork blood as its primary ingredient. Additional ingredients may include barley and herbs such as marjoram, as well as other foods and seasonings. Some versions are prepared with coagulated pork blood and other coagulated pork offal, such as intestine, liver and heart.

Varieties

China
Pork blood soup is soup in Chinese cuisine, and was consumed by laborers in Kaifeng "over 1,000 years ago", along with offal dumplings called jiaozi.

Czech Republic
Prdelačka is a traditional Czech pork blood soup made during the pig slaughter season. It is prepared with pork blood pudding, potato, onion and garlic as primary ingredients.

Thailand
Pork blood soup is soup in Thai cuisine. Tom lueat mu is a Thai pork blood soup that is prepared with pork blood as a primary ingredient.

See also

 Blood as food
 Blood soup – contains a list of blood soups
 List of Chinese soups
 List of pork dishes
 List of soups

References

Blood soups
Pork dishes
Chinese soups
Thai soups